The Bemboka River, a perennial stream of the Bega River catchment, is located in the Monaro and South Coast regions of New South Wales, Australia.

Course and features
The river descends  over its  course.

In its upper reaches, the Bemboka River is impounded by the Cochrane Dam to form the Cochrane Lake. The main purpose of the dam is to supply water for a run-of-the-river hydroelectric power station at the downstream Brown Mountain Power Station, and for irrigation purposes.

The Bemboka River was previously the name given to the Bega River.  The name Bemboka River now only applies down to its confluence with Tantawangalo Creek, from where the water course is then known as the Bega River.

See also

 List of rivers of Australia
 List of rivers of New South Wales (A–K)
 Rivers of New South Wales

References

External links
 

Rivers of New South Wales
South Coast (New South Wales)